The 1962–63 Hong Kong First Division League season was the 52nd since its establishment.

League table

References
1962–63 Hong Kong First Division table (RSSSF)

Hong Kong First Division League seasons
Hong
football